The Helping Hand (also known as THH) is a halfway house in Singapore, registered as a Singapore non-governmental organization. The stated objective of the organization is to "transform lives of ex-offenders through the love of Jesus Christ into restored and hardworking individuals, re-integrating them back into society as stable and contributing citizens".

History and Working Model
The Helping Hand was founded in 1987 by Robert Yeo, a Heroin addict. It is registered as a Voluntary Welfare Organization under the Singapore Ministry of Community Development, Youth and Sports with an Institution of Public Character Status.

The organization aims to rehabilitate drug offenders through its stated method of 4 types of therapy - Spiritual, Work, Social and Physical. Drug offenders in therapy (called the Residents) typically undergo 3–6 months of treatment, during which they will receive individual and group counselling. Residents stay at The Helping Hand premises (located in Serangoon) throughout their therapy.

Funding
The Helping Hand receives operational cash primarily from sales from the furniture business that it operates. The prices are priced at 10 percent to 20 percent lower than the market rate. It can thus be defined as a social enterprise. Its premises at Serangoon serves as a warehouse where it showcases hundreds of Indonesian made Teak furniture to the public. The Helping Hand also gets income from its moving services. They hire Residents as workers for both services.

It was reported in 2011 that even though more and more people are engaging its services, The Helping Hand still faces stigma from its businesses as most of its workers are ex-addicts.

Side Ventures
The Helping Hand also engages in many side ventures started by Residents. These services include computer repairs and gardening services. The main aim of these ventures is to help former offenders instead of generating profits. These ventures are usually started when Residents indicate interest in a certain business they wish to explore.

References

Drug and alcohol rehabilitation centers
Medical and health organisations based in Singapore
Organizations established in 1987